Technological University (Panglong) is located on Loilem-Nansang main road in Loilem District, Shan State, Myanmar.

To establish as Government Technological College, GTC (Pinlon) in Loilem township, Southern Shan State, the construction of main building and workshop of building area 125952 sq.ft was implemented  on 1 July 2002 with the permission of cabinet meeting which was opened it on 11 February 2003. The construction works were completely finished on 24 May 2004. It was opened as a Government Technological College (GTC) on 27 September 2002 and then upgraded as Technological University (Pinlon) on 20 January 2007 by the Government.Panglong Technological University Students' Union was established in 2018 with 12 members.
Current Chairman- Nang Khaing Khin Khin khant..

Programs

List of rectors
U Min Min Oo (6.10.2002–5.5.2006)
Dr. Zarni Aung (23.2.2005–5.5.2006)
Dr. Han Min Tun (6.5.2016–25.9.2006)
Dr. Aung Myo Lin (26.9.2016–22.1.2009)
Dr. Kyaw Kyaw Myint (23.1.2009–26.2.2009)
Dr. Aung San Lin (27.2.2009–30.12.2009)
Dr. Kyaw Kyaw Myint (1.1.2010–18.1.2010)
Dr. Pan Thu Tun (19.1.2010–8.3.2012)
Dr. Oakkar (8.3.2012–8.4.2015)
Dr. Min Aung Hlaing'Son (9.4.2015–Non CDMer)

Departments

Civil Engineering Department
Electronics Engineering Department
Electrical Power Engineering Department
Mechanical Engineering Department
Academic Department

See also
Technological University, Taunggyi
Technological University, Lashio
Technological University, Loikaw
Technological University, Kyaingtong
List of Technological Universities in Myanmar

References

External links

Technological universities in Myanmar
Universities and colleges in Shan State